MULTICUBE ("Multi-objective Design Space Exploration of MultiProcessor-SoC Architectures for Embedded Multimedia Applications") is a Seventh Framework Programme (FP7) project aimed to define innovative methods for the design optimization of computer architectures for the embedded system domain.

Background
Embedded systems are specialized computing systems for wide domain of applications ranging from mobile phones and wearable electronics for military applications to control systems for automobile, factories and home automation. Even if all these domains are different, they are all characterized by their computational and programmability needs. All these applications need an underlying computing platform specially designed to cater to the application needs.

The improvements in Very Large Scale Integrations technology (VLSI) and the availability of the high computational power provided by System-on-a-Chip (SoC) has enabled development of highly sophisticated embedded applications. Today, the computer architectures are often designed in a multi-core paradigm, where more processors are integrated onto the same chip/die. This type of computer architecture can also be referred to as Chip-MultiProcessors (CMP), MultiProcessor-SoC (MPSoC) or, Network On Chip (NoC) where different processors communicate via a network infrastructure.

Challenges in MPSoC Design Optimization
Designing complex systems on chip many platform parameters has to be tuned. This is done in order to maximize platform performances while minimizing non functional costs such as the power consumption. This tuning phase is called Design Space Exploration (DSE). This process can be formalized as a multiobjective optimization problem where non-commensurable objectives have to be maximized (or minimized).

In the context of MPSoC design, the problem is twofold:
 Given the large amount of platform parameters and the large number of values that these parameters can assume, the design space of advanced computer architectures is huge. Theoretically, identifying the Pareto-optimal solutions in such space requires the evaluation of each platform configuration value sets. This is impracticable.
 The evaluation of a single candidate architecture configuration generally requires the performance analysis over a detailed system model. Generally this analysis is performed via computationally expensive simulations. Depending on platform and application complexity a single computer simulation can take hours or even days.

Approach
With the aim to reduce the design time of future embedded systems, the MULTICUBE project faces the problems related to multiobjective DSE of MPSoC platforms.
The MULTICUBE project defines an automatic framework for DSE providing advanced methodologies for heuristic optimization and techniques for analyzing the effects of platform parameters in order to restrict the search space to the crucial ones enabling an efficient optimization.

To have a trade-off between exploration speed and solution accuracy, the MULTICUBE project proposes a multilevel modeling methodology. The underlying idea is that the expensive simulations with a detailed low-level system model are not always needed. Rather, for obtaining sufficient number of design points, approximate but faster evaluation methods are acceptable. Thus, the multilevel system modeling enables quick analysis of many design points using high level models. The final configuration is obtained by performing a more accurate low level simulations on the most promising candidates obtained from the high level approximation methods.

Among other activities, the MULTICUBE project develops open source tools for MPSoC modeling and optimization providing to the research and engineering communities the above-mentioned methodologies.

References

Further reading
complete MULTICUBE publication list
CORDIS
Multicube Explorer - A Design Space Exploration Framework for Embedded Systems-on-Chip
Discrete Particle Swarm Optimization for Multi-objective Design Space Exploration

External links
project website
MULTICUBE SCoPE
MULTICUBE explorer
EDACafé

Embedded systems